Route 530, or Highway 530, may refer to:

Canada
 Alberta Highway 530
 Manitoba Provincial Road 530
 New Brunswick Route 530

United Kingdom
 A530 road

United States 

 
 
 
 
 
 
 
 
 
 
 Texas: